Boy from Heaven (released in North America as Cairo Conspiracy) is a 2022 Arabic-language political thriller film directed by Swedish filmmaker Tarik Saleh. The film is a co-production between Sweden, France and Finland. The film had its world premiere on 20 May 2022 at the 2022 Cannes Film Festival, where it was selected to compete for the Palme d'Or. At Cannes, Saleh was awarded Best Screenplay and the film received the François Chalais Prize. The film was selected as the Swedish entry for the Best International Feature Film at the 95th Academy Awards, and made the December shortlist.

Premise
Adam, the son of a fisherman, accepts an offer to study at the prestigious Al-Azhar University in Cairo, Egypt. Shortly after his arrival, the Grand Imam of al-Azhar suddenly dies and a power struggle to replace him ensues.

Cast
 Tawfeek Barhom as Adam
 Fares Fares as Ibrahim
 Mohammad Bakri as General Al Sakran
 Makram Khoury as Sheikh Negm
 Mehdi Dehbi as Zizo
 Moe Ayoub as Sobhy
 Sherwan Haji as Soliman
 Abduljabbar Alsuhili as Alasfour
 Ahmed Lassaoui
 Jalal Altawil
 Ramzi Choukair as Sheikh Durani
 Yunus Albayrak as Sharia Teacher
 Mouloud Ayad as Nazim
 Okan Bozkuş as Student
 Youssef Salama Zeki as Biology Teacher
 Ayman Fathy as Soldier
 Amr Mosad as Harun

Production
The film was shot primarily at the Süleymaniye Mosque in Istanbul, Turkey.

Reception
On Rotten Tomatoes, the film holds an approval rating of 77% based on 26 reviews, with an average rating of 7.4/10. The website's consensus reads, "Although it may not fully unlock the promise of its tension-rich setting and premise, Cairo Conspiracys strong performances and sophisticated script offer solidly satisfying compensation". According to Metacritic, which assigned a weighted average score of 74 out of 100 based on 10 critics, the film received "generally favorable reviews".

Awards and nominations

See also
 List of submissions to the 95th Academy Awards for Best International Feature Film
 List of Swedish submissions for the Academy Award for Best International Feature Film

References

External links
 

2022 films
2022 thriller films
2020s political thriller films
2020s Arabic-language films
2020s French films
Films directed by Tarik Saleh
Films set in Cairo
Swedish political thriller films
French political thriller films
Finnish political thriller films
Films shot in Istanbul